FC Indiana Girls Academy is the youth academy and development system of Women's Premier Soccer League club, F.C. Indiana. The academy currently consists of players spanning different age groups, from U12 to U20. The senior squad plays in the Women's Premier Soccer League, the second tier of the US soccer pyramid. All teams play their home games at Newton Park in Lakeville, Indiana.

The Academy trains players from the U10 age group up to the U20 squad and has separate head coaches in charge of development in the U10-U12, U13-U14 and U15-U17 age groups. At U20 level there is a dedicated coaching team managed by Justin Crew.

The Academy has affiliations with the Fédération Haïtienne de Football (FHF) and the Cayman Islands Football Association (CIFA).

Lakeville, Indiana
Indiana Girls Academy
F.C. Indiana
2015 establishments in Indiana
Association football clubs established in 2015